During the 1998–99 English football season, Grimsby Town F.C. competed in the Football League First Division.

Season summary
Grimsby had a great first season back in the First Division after relegation two seasons ago, finishing in a satisfying 11th place, with club captain Groves being their top scorer with 15 in all competitions.

Transfers

Transfers In

Transfers Out

Loans Out

Final league table

Squad

References

Grimsby Town F.C. seasons
Grimsby Town